The River Worth is a river in West Yorkshire, England. It flows from minor tributaries on the moors above Watersheddles Reservoir down the Worth Valley to Haworth, where it is joined by Bridgehouse Beck which flows from Oxenhope. The River Worth is itself a tributary of the River Aire, which it joins at the end of the Worth Valley in Keighley.

Course

There are many small streams that feed Watersheddles Reservoir (yards over the border in Lancashire) from which the River Worth is fed. From the reservoir, the river flows east into Ponden Reservoir into the town of Haworth where it is joined by Bridgehouse Beck. It then flows east north-east through the suburbs of Keighley into the town centre where North Beck flows into it, it then continues down towards Stockbridge where it joins the River Aire.

Natural history

The river was once very polluted, but the lack of local industry nowadays has seen the river become much cleaner and it supports many forms of wildlife throughout its course. Herons, kingfishers and dippers are now a common sight. The river currently has a population of small brown trout and grayling, but they are restricted to certain parts by a number of high weirs left behind from its industrial past.

History

The river provided power for the wool and clothing mills. Woollen and worsted manufacture was introduced here with the first cotton-mill in Yorkshire, Low Mill at Keighley, erected in 1780.

Leisure

The river valley is home to the Keighley & Worth Valley Railway. Bradford City Council have marked out a short/middle (circular) distance walk along the valley called The Worth Way. Angling is also allowed by permit at certain places along the river.

Lists

Tributaries

 Little Spring Dike
 Dean Clough
 Whitestone Clough
 Ponden Clough Beck
 Lumb Beck
 Lower Pitcher Clough
 Sladen Beck
 Bridgehouse Beck
 North Beck

Settlements

 Stanbury
 Oldfield
 Haworth
 Oakworth
 Damems
 Keighley

Crossings

 Unnamed road, Silver Hill Bank
 Unnamed road, Old Snap Bottoms
 Old Lane, Old House
 Ponden Lane, Scar Top
 Ponden Bridge
 Lumbfoot Road, Lumb Foot
 Lord Bridge, Mytholmes
 Spring Head Road, Mytholmes
 Victoria Avenue, Mytholmes
 Mytholmes Lane, Oakworth
 Unnamed road, Damems
 Keighley & Worth Valley Railway
 A629, Keighley
 Woodhouse Road, Keighley
 Coney Lane, Keighley
 Gresley Road, Keighley
 Low Mill Lane, Keighley
 Main Line Railway
 Dalton Lane, Keighley
 A650 (Aire Valley Road), Keighley
 Aireworth Road, Keighley

Gallery

Sources

Ordnance Survey Open Data https://www.ordnancesurvey.co.uk/business-government/tools-support/open-data-support

References

Rivers of West Yorkshire
Rivers of Bradford
Aire catchment